Lengua is the Spanish word for "tongue".  It is used for either of two Mascoian languages of Paraguay: 

 Enxet language (Southern Lengua)
 Enlhet language (Northern Lengua)